Kadyy is an urban-type settlement and the administrative center of Kadyysky District, Kostroma Oblast, Russia. Population:

References

Notes

Sources

Urban-type settlements in Kostroma Oblast
Kadyysky District
Makaryevsky Uyezd (Kostroma Governorate)